Municipal elections were held in Ontario, Canada, on October 25, 2010. Voters in Ontario elected mayors, councillors, school board trustees and all other elected officials in all of the province's municipalities. A total of 444 elections were held. Several smaller municipalities in Northern Ontario held no council elections, as their entire councils were acclaimed into office, although the towns still saw contested elections for their school board seats.

Voting date 
Notwithstanding advance polling arrangements, municipal elections were held on the fourth Monday of October. From 1978 until 2006 the second Monday of November was the fixed date.

Nomination period 
Candidate registration opened on January 4, 2010 and ended on September 10.

Term lengths 
The Legislative Assembly of Ontario legislation (Bill 81, Schedule H), passed in 2006, sets the length of terms in office for all municipal elected officials at four years.

Campaigns in major cities 
The Toronto municipal election saw an open contest for mayor, due to the retirement of David Miller after two terms. In Ottawa, former MPP and Mayor Jim Watson ran against incumbent Larry O'Brien, who was cleared of bribery charges in 2009.

Some media, including a Sudbury Star editorial which was republished in several other Sun Media newspapers, noted the seeming emergence of a Tea Party mentality in some parts of the province, with a number of self-styled "outsider" or populist candidates – including Rob Ford in Toronto, Joe Fontana in London, David D'Intino in St. Catharines, Rob Matheson in Kingston, Ron Schinners in Sault Ste. Marie and Marianne Matichuk in Greater Sudbury – campaigning on platforms that traded heavily in mistrust of the existing municipal governments.

Single tier municipalities

Brant County

Brantford

Chatham-Kent

Greater Sudbury

Haldimand County

|- style="background-color:#fcfcfc;"
!rowspan="2" colspan="2" style="text-align:center;" |Candidate
!colspan="3" style="text-align:center;" |Popular vote
|- style="background-color:#fcfcfc;"
| style="text-align:center;" | Votes
| style="text-align:center;" |%
| style="text-align:center;" |±%
|-
| style="background-color:#FFFFFF;" |
| style="text-align:left;" | Craig Grice (incumbent)
| style="text-align:right;" | 1,578
| style="text-align:right;" | 41.43%
| style="text-align:right;" | n/a
|-
| style="background-color:#FFFFFF;" |
| style="text-align:left;" | Gary McHale
| style="text-align:right;" |1,097
| style="text-align:right;" |28.8%
| style="text-align:right;" | n/a
|-
| style="background-color:#FFFFFF;" |
| style="text-align:left;" | Bryan Barker
| style="text-align:right;" |933
| style="text-align:right;" |24.5
| style="text-align:right;" | n/a
|-
| style="background-color:#FFFFFF;" |
| style="text-align:left;" | Rob Duncan
| style="text-align:right;" |177
| style="text-align:right;" |5.27%
| style="text-align:right;" | n/a
|-
| style="text-align:right;background-color:#FFFFFF;" colspan="2" |Total Votes
| style="text-align:right;background-color:#FFFFFF;" |3,809
| style="text-align:right;background-color:#FFFFFF;" |100%
| style="text-align:right;background-color:#FFFFFF;" |
|- 
| style="text-align:right;background-color:#FFFFFF;" colspan="2" |Registered Voters
| style="text-align:right;background-color:#FFFFFF;" |8,090
| style="text-align:right;background-color:#FFFFFF;" |47.08%
| style="text-align:right;background-color:#FFFFFF;" |n/a
|- 
| style="text-align:left;" colspan="6" |Note: All Haldimand County Municipal Elections are officially non-partisan.  Note: Candidate campaign colours are based on the prominent colour used in campaign items (signs, literature, etc.)and are used as a visual differentiation between candidates.
|- 
| style="text-align:left;" colspan="13" |Sources: Haldimand County Clerk's Office
|}

Hamilton

Kawartha Lakes

Norfolk County

Ottawa

Prince Edward County

Toronto

Regional municipalities

Durham

Halton

Muskoka District

Niagara

Oxford

Peel

Waterloo

York

Counties

Bruce

Dufferin

Elgin

Essex

Frontenac

Grey

Haliburton

Hastings

Huron

Lambton

Lanark

Leeds and Grenville

Lennox and Addington

Middlesex

Northumberland

Perth

Peterborough

Prescott and Russell

Renfrew

Simcoe

Stormont, Dundas and Glengarry

Wellington

Separated municipalities

Barrie

Belleville

Brockville

Gananoque

Guelph

Kingston

London

Orillia

Pembroke

Peterborough

Prescott

Quinte West

Smiths Falls

St. Marys

St. Thomas

Stratford

Windsor

Districts

Algoma District

Cochrane District

Kenora District

Manitoulin District

Nipissing District

Parry Sound District

Rainy River District

Sudbury District

Thunder Bay District

Timiskaming District

In fiction
The 2010 first season of the TV sitcom Dan for Mayor takes place during the municipal election in the fictional city of Wessex.

See also
 Canadian electoral calendar, 2010
 Electronic voting in Canada
 Municipal elections in Canada
 2006 Ontario municipal elections

References